Jabari Brooks Wamble (born 1979) is an American lawyer who is the nominee to serve as a United States district judge of the United States District Court for the District of Kansas. He is the former nominee of the United States Court of Appeals for the Tenth Circuit.

Education 
Wamble earned a Bachelor of Arts degree from the University of Kansas in 2002 and a Juris Doctor from the University of Kansas School of Law in 2006.

Career 
In 2006 and 2007, Wamble served as an Assistant District Attorney in the Johnson County District Attorney's Office. From 2007 to 2011, he was an Assistant Attorney General in the Office of the Kansas Attorney General. Wamble has served as an Assistant United States Attorney in the United States Attorney’s Office for the District of Kansas since 2011.

Notable cases 

In 2011, Wamble prosecuted Luis Lozano-Lara who was not a citizen of the United States. He was charged with unlawfully re-entering the United States after having been convicted of an aggravated felony and deported.
In 2013, Wamble prosecuted Advantage Framing, a framing company in Spring Hill, Kansas charged with harboring undocumented workers employed by the company. The company allegedly issued checks to crew leaders, who then cashed the checks and paid the workers in cash. The company didn’t pay the undocumented workers Social Security costs, workers compensation or unemployment benefits that would be paid to lawfully employed workers.   The three owners of the company were each sentenced to 366 days in prison.
In 2015, Wamble prosecuted Dale Williamson of Kansas City, who pleaded guilty to five counts of bank robbery. He was sentenced to four years and seven months in prison.
In 2016, Wamble prosecuted Alan Wenk on 20 counts of bank fraud in connection with an embezzlement scheme at Lenexa-based Performance Contracting Group (PCG) that netted $135,000. Wenk was sentenced to 15 months in Federal prison.
In 2016, Wamble prosecuted Overland Park businessman Richard Ballard on two counts of wire fraud after he raised about $1.23 million from 18 people for five business ventures Ballard founded. Ballard was sentenced to 27 months in prison and ordered to pay $415,000 in restitution.
In 2016, Wamble prosecuted Susan Wooten-Robb, a former employee at Community America Credit Union for embezzling $34,000 from two customer accounts and a teller drawer. She was sentenced to three years supervised release and ordered to reimburse the full amount of the money she stole in exchange for her guilty plea.
In March 2022, a federal judge ordered Kansas businessman Charlie James to pay approximately $215,000 in restitution and serve one year of probation as part of his sentence for failing to pay over payroll tax collections to the Internal Revenue Service. James was the co-owner of KC United, LLC and pleaded guilty to one count of conspiracy to defraud the United States. Jabari Wamble prosecuted the case.

Expired nomination to federal court of appeals 
On August 9, 2022, President Joe Biden announced his intent to nominate Wamble to serve as a United States circuit judge of the United States Court of Appeals for the Tenth Circuit. On September 6, 2022, his nomination was sent to the Senate. President Biden nominated Wamble to the seat vacated by Judge Mary Beck Briscoe, who assumed senior status on March 15, 2021. On January 3, 2023, his nomination was returned to the President under Rule XXXI, Paragraph 6 of the United States Senate.

Nomination to district court 
On February 22, 2023, President Biden announced his intent to nominate Wamble to serve as a United States district judge of the United States District Court for the District of Kansas. On February 27, 2023, his nomination was sent to the Senate. President Biden nominated Wamble to the seat vacated by Judge Julie A. Robinson, who assumed senior status on January 14, 2022. His nomination is pending before the Senate Judiciary Committee.

Personal life

Wamble is married to Marissa Cleaver and is the son-in-law of Missouri Congressman Emanuel Cleaver.

References 

1979 births
Living people
21st-century American lawyers
African-American lawyers
Assistant United States Attorneys
Kansas lawyers
People from Oklahoma City
University of Kansas alumni
University of Kansas School of Law alumni